Justin Turner (born 12 March 1990) is an Australian rugby union footballer. His regular playing position is scrum-half. He currently represents the Western Force in Super Rugby. He made his debut for the franchise during the 2010 Super 14 season against the Stormers in Perth.

Turner was a member of the Australia under 20 team that competed in the 2010 IRB Junior World Championship.

References

External links 
Western Force profile
itsrugby.co.uk profile

1990 births
Living people
Australian rugby union players
Perth Spirit players
Rugby union players from Tzaneen
Rugby union scrum-halves
Western Force players